Agios Theodoros is a village located in the Nicosia District of Cyprus, east of the town of Evrychou.

References

Communities in Nicosia District